Qarah Darreh or Qareh Darreh or Qareh Dareh or Qarahdarreh may refer to:
 Qareh Darreh, East Azerbaijan
 Qarah Darreh, Fars
 Qarah Darreh, Kurdistan
 Qarah Darreh, Zanjan
 Qareh Darreh, Ijrud, Zanjan Province